Agathon Meurman (9 October 1826, Kangasala – 17 January 1909, Helsinki) was a Finnish politician and journalist. He was one of the key persons of the Fennoman movement and since 1863 the leader of the Finnish Party together with Yrjö Sakari Yrjö-Koskinen.

In 1883–1890 Meurman published the first Finnish language encyclopaedia Sanakirja yleiseen sivistykseen kuuluvia tietoja varten. It was mostly based on the German Meyers Encyclopedia.

Selected works 
Finnish–French Dictionary (1877)
Sanakirja yleiseen sivistykseen kuuluvia tietoja varten (1883–1890)
Finnish-Russian Dictionary (1885)
Memoirs (1909)

References 

1826 births
1909 deaths
People from Kangasala
Swedish-speaking Finns
Finnish people of Swedish descent
Finnish Party politicians
Members of the Diet of Finland
Encyclopedists
Finnish journalists
Finnish lexicographers
Finnish writers
University of Helsinki alumni
19th-century Finnish people
19th-century lexicographers